Mad River is a western novel by Donald Hamilton.

Plot summary
Boyd Cohoon comes back from prison for the girl; her brother, who'd done the crime; the mine owner who'd gotten rich; and the sheriff, his boyhood friend.

Publication history
1956, US, Collier's, 1/6/1956, 1/20/1956, 2/3/1956, serial (literature)
1956, US, Dell, Dell First Edition #91, paperback
1957, UK, Allan Wingate, hardcover
1965, US, Fawcett Publications, Gold Medal k1500, paperback, reissued many times

1956 American novels
Western (genre) novels
Novels by Donald Hamilton